Seliberia  is a genus of rod-shaped bacteria.

References

Further reading 
 
 

Monotypic bacteria genera
Hyphomicrobiales
Bacteria genera